Fretherne is a small village and former civil parish, now in the parish of Fretherne with Saul, in the Stroud district, in Gloucestershire, England, situated between the larger villages of Frampton-on-Severn and Arlingham. In 1881 the parish had a population of 239. In the Domesday Book of 1086 it is recorded as held by Turstin FitzRolf. The village name probably originates from O.E. 'Frithorne,' meaning 'Freo's thorn.'

A public footpath 50 metres west of the church leads to Hock Cliff at the River Severn (at its widest pre-estuary point), which is popular with fossil hunters.

On 24 March 1884 the parish was abolished to form "Fretherne with Saul".

See also
Fretherne Court

References

External links

Villages in Gloucestershire
Former civil parishes in Gloucestershire
Stroud District